Tomás Juan Carlos Solari (March 26, 1899 – May 13, 1954) was a prelate of the Roman Catholic Church. He served as auxiliary bishop of Buenos Aires from 1943 till 1948, when he became archbishop of La Plata.

Life 
Born in Buenos Aires, Solari was ordained to the priesthood on April 19, 1924.

On August 23, 1943, he was appointed auxiliary bishop of Buenos Aires and titular bishop of Aulon. Solari received his episcopal consecration on the following November 11 from Santiago Luis Cardinal Copello, archbishop of Buenos Aires, with the auxiliary bishop of Buenos Aires, Antonio Rocca, and the auxiliary bishop of Buenos Aires, Miguel de Andrea, serving as co-consecrators.

On September 20, 1948, he was appointed archbishop of La Plata, where he was installed on November 11 that year.

As a bishop he was principal consecrator of bishop Enrique Rau.

He died on May 13, 1954.

See also

References

External links 
 Entry about Tomás Juan Carlos Solari at catholic-hierarchy.org

1899 births
1954 deaths
20th-century Roman Catholic archbishops in Argentina
Roman Catholic archbishops of La Plata in Argentina